KAMD-FM (97.1 FM) is a radio station licensed to Camden, Arkansas, United States. The station airs a Sports talk format, as an affiliate of Fox Sports Radio, and is owned by Radio Works/Bunyard Broadcasting.

References

External links

AMD-FM
Radio stations established in 1968
1968 establishments in Arkansas
Sports radio stations in the United States
Fox Sports Radio stations
Camden, Arkansas